Erica Andrews (September 30, 1969 – March 11, 2013) was a Mexican international and national beauty pageant title winner, drag performer, actress, entrepreneur, and activist.

Early life and career
Erica Andrews was born on September 30, 1969, in Allende, Nuevo León, Mexico.

She grew up on a small ranch called Los Aguirres in the rural outskirts of Allende, where there was little electricity. She changed her name to Erica, a name she derived from a phonetic pronunciation of Eddie. She attached a colloquial ca to the end of Eddie so that it sounded like Eddieca and formed the name Erica. Consequently, she became Erica Salazar. Beginning around 1989–1990, she took on the stage name Erica Hutton. She named herself after Lauren Hutton, whom she admired. After she met Tandi Andrews, who became her drag mother and mentor, she changed her stage name to Erica Hutton Andrews and subsequently to Erica Andrews.

Andrews was born into a family with two older brothers and a younger sister. During her childhood, her father was sentenced to ten years in prison for a drug offense. Andrews spent her childhood in Allende through the age of 8, when her mother and siblings crossed the border and settled in Laredo, Texas. Though Andrews maintained a relationship with her mother and siblings, she became estranged from her father and never saw him again. Upon leaving home, Andrews attended college for two years, earning an associate degree. She attended cosmetology school and became a licensed cosmetologist. She began to work as a make-up artist and consultant at department store makeup counters for MAC Cosmetics and also for Glamour Shots.

In an interview with Ambiente Magazine in 2005, Andrews recalled a difficult childhood. She described being referred to as a little girl instead of a little boy by a guest speaker at her elementary school and being laughed at by the students. She also remembered in high school returning home from a volleyball game and being taunted by two guys who threw her down, kicked dirt on her, and punched her a couple of times. On the Tyra Banks Show as well as in an online radio interview with Richard Curtin, Andrews discussed a time when she was about 17 when she ran away from home and struggled because of the challenges she faced as a trans woman. She began her estrogen hormone replacement therapy when she was 18. She had undergone silicone and electrolysis treatment. Andrews said she had never had any plastic surgery on her face or body.

Career
At 18, she was introduced to drag and female impersonation through her then boyfriend who was a female impersonator and drag pageant contestant. In 1988, at 18, Andrews moved with him to San Antonio, Texas, where she made a name for herself in the drag circuit. Her first performance was at a club named Las Gueras to the song Break Away. She began performing on amateur nights at the now defunct Paper Moon night club (later The Saint) on Main Avenue in San Antonio. Andrews won the Paper Moon talent of the week and talent of the month contests. This led to her participation in Paper Moon's Newcomer of the year contest in which she placed third. At the encouragement and support of Raphael Ruiz de Velasco (owner of The Saint night club), Andrews entered the Miss San Antonio USA pageant.

Beauty pageants
Andrews actively participated in beauty pageants. She was a celebrated multi-national and international titleholder. According to an article in the Houston Chronicle, she was considered "one of the most decorated queens on the pageant circuit". She was called "the most beautiful drag queen in captivity". The first pageant title that Andrews won was Miss Just Us (1989). She was a promoter for the Miss Texas Continental franchise.

Andrews won numerous pageant titles. Her titles include:

Live performances
Andrews performed on the United States LGBT drag circuit. Andrews performed at San Antonio nightclubs like The Saint, Heat, The Bonham, and The Pegasus.

Andrews imitated Hollywood greats such as Joan Crawford, Cher, top Latin artist Selena Quintanilla-Pérez, and fictional characters like Jessica Rabbit and Wonder Woman. Her performances included the Mommie Dearest boardroom scene which was accompanied by a Shirley Bassey mix to I (Who Have Nothing) as well as a depiction of Mary Katherine Gallagher, a fictional character who is a sardonic caricature of an unpopular teen Catholic school girl invented by Saturday Night Live cast member Molly Shannon and featured in Superstar.

Drag Family
Erica was the drag mother of Janet Andrews, Miss Gay Texas USofA 2018. She was also the drag mother of Roxxxy Andrews, a drag queen who has appeared on the popular reality television series RuPaul's Drag Race and RuPaul's Drag Race All Stars.

Activism
In 2010, Andrews was the first model for the Faces of Life photographic project that originated from Dallas, Texas. The project by Jorge Rivas was created to bring awareness to people who are HIV positive or have AIDS.

Later life and death
In 2012, after making San Antonio her home base for many years, Andrews moved to Indiana, to be with her boyfriend.

Andrews died from complications as a result of a lung infection on March 11, 2013, at UIC hospital in Chicago, Illinois.

Works

Television

Stage productions
In 2002, Andrews' first stage performance was in Jotos del Barrio, a play written by Jesus Alonzo that explored the lives of young gay Latinos. The play was presented as a series of poems, monologues, and vignettes. She played a transgender character, Janie la Transie. In an interview with the San Antonio Current, Andrews spoke of her ability to relate to the character. She also played an additional role as the biological mother of a young gay male.

In 2004, Andrews played the lead role of The Succubus, a vampire lesbian, in Charles Busch's off-Broadway satirical play Vampire Lesbians of Sodom, produced by the Actors Theatre of San Antonio group.

In 2009, Andrews performed in Jesus Alonzo's play Miss America: A Mexicanito's Fairy Tale at the Esperanza Peace and Justice Center in San Antonio. The play was about a nine-year-old boy, Chuy, who dreamed of becoming Miss America. Andrews portrayed Chuy's fairy godmother.

Film
Andrews appeared three times on Maury (the Maury Povich Show) and on The Tyra Banks Show. She was also a make-up artist on the Maury Povich show in New York City. In 2007, Andrews did a cameo in Jennifer Lopez's music video, Do It Well from her Brave album, but does not appear in the final edition; And had a cameo as a street walker on Maroon 5's music video (at the 2:09 mark) Won't Go Home Without You from It Won't Be Soon Before Long album. In 2011, she appeared as the love interest in Deborah Vial's music video for the single Don't Make Me Take It from her debut album, Stages and Stones.

Andrews' screen appearances included the United Kingdom-produced documentary Trantasia (2008) which chronicled Andrews' participation in The World's Most Beautiful Transsexual Contest in Las Vegas, Nevada. In 2010, she starred in a supporting role in the revenge-horror-exploitation film Ticked-Off Trannies with Knives.

Music video

References

External links 

 

1969 births
2013 deaths
Mexican drag queens
Mexican beauty pageant winners
Actresses from Nuevo León
Mexican LGBT actors
Mexican transgender people
Transgender drag performers
Miss International Queen winners
Deaths from respiratory tract infection